Yichun is a prefecture-level city on the Songhua river in Heilongjiang province, People's Republic of China. At the 2010 census, Yichun has a total population of 1,148,126 while 729,202 people live in 15 districts separated by forests. The greening rate of Yichun is up to 83%. The nickname of Yichun is Lindu.

History

Yichun was named after the Yichun River, which is a small tributary of Tangwang River. The word Yichun means "nine" in Mongolian language. During the Shang Dynasty Yichun was populated by the Sushen. Before the Tang Dynasty, the region was inhabited by several nomad tribes in the northeastern border area of China including Sushen and Donghu. During the Qing Dynasty, Yichun was under the administration of Qiqihar and Hulan's Deputy Lieutenant-General (Fudutong) before it became a minor town under Tangyuan County's jurisdiction in the 1890s.

The region's real development began after the establishment of Manchukuo after Japanese force seized Manchuria in 1932. In November 1941, a railway from Suihua to Jiamusi was built before its branch was extended to today's Yichun district from Nancha in July 1942. In 1945, Yichun was established as Yichunjie (Yichun Street) under Tangyuan County's control. As a major center of lumber industry, Yichun has grown at an astonishing rate since 1949. In 1952 Yichun County was established by the PRC Government. On 13 Feb 1958 Yichun was designated a Prefecture-level city. However, in order to set up a pilot of the combination of enterprise management and government, The CPC Central Committee and State Council approved to establish Yichun Special District instead of Yichun City in 1964. In 1979 the City of Yichun was reinstated. Jiayin and Tieli were put into Yichun's jurisdiction.

Geography

The Lesser Khingan Mountains cross the city. The channels and valleys are densely covered with trees and grasslands in the administrative area of Yichun. There are 702 rivers in total and the total water pondage is 10.2 billion steres, and the rivers belong to the branches of Amur River and Songhua River systems. Tangwanghe River is the main river of Yichun.

Climate
Yichun has a monsoon-influenced, hemiboreal climate (Köppen Dwb), with long, bitterly cold, but very dry winters, and very warm, humid summers. However, the monsoon still means that more than 60% of the annual precipitation falls from June to August alone.

Subdivisions
On 13 Jun 2019, the District division adjustment plan of Yichun, which plans to merge all of the original 15 districts to 4 districts and 4 counties was approved by the State Council.

Yichun, Heilongjiang currently comprises 4 districts, 1 county-level city and 5 counties. 
Districts: Yimei, Wucui, Youhao and Jinlin
County-level city: Tieli
Counties: Tangwang, Fenglin, Nancha and Dajingshan

Economy
The city's GDP topped RMB 20.24 billion in 2010, featuring a growth of 15.7% over the previous year. In 2010, value-added industrial output generated by enterprises with designated size or above rose 29.3% to RMB 7.12 billion. In 2010, the foreign trade value of Yichun totaled US$302.23 million, up 36.3% year on year.

Wood processing and metallurgy are the main industries in Yichun. In 2010, value-added industrial output from wood processing increased 34% to RMB 2.01 billion, while that from metallurgy rose 39.2% to RMB 2.2 billion, accounting for 33.6% of the industrial sector's total. These two industries accounted for 91% of Yichun's total value-added industrial output according to the statistics in 2009.

Transportation
It started operations in August 2009, and is capable of serving 142,000 passengers a year. 
Yichun Railway Station operates daily trains to Harbin, the capital of Heilongjiang Province. The Yichun-Hegang Highway and the Yichun-Harbin Highway(part of Hegang-Harbin Highway) connect the city with other cities in Heilongjiang Province.

References

External links

 Yichun City 

 
Cities in Heilongjiang
Prefecture-level divisions of Heilongjiang